Victoria is a 1979 Swedish drama film directed by Bo Widerberg based on Knut Hamsun's 1898 novel. It was entered into the 1979 Cannes Film Festival.

Cast
In alphabetical order
 Hans Christian Blech
 Erik Eriksson as Johannes' Father
 Christiane Hörbiger as Victoria's Mother
 Thor W. Jacobsen
 Michaela Jolin as Victoria
 Gustaf Kleen
 Peter Schildt
 Stephan Schwartz as Johannes
 Pia Skagermark as Camilla
 Sigmar Solbach as Otto

References

External links

1979 films
1970s Swedish-language films
1979 drama films
Films directed by Bo Widerberg
Films based on Norwegian novels
Films based on works by Knut Hamsun
Swedish drama films
1970s Swedish films